The 1989–90 Georgia Bulldogs basketball team represented the University of Georgia as a member of the Southeastern Conference during the 1989–90 NCAA men's basketball season. The team was led by head coach Hugh Durham, and played their home games at Stegeman Coliseum in Athens, Georgia. The Bulldogs won the SEC Regular season title, and received an at-large bid to the NCAA tournament as No. 7 seed in the Midwest region. They were defeated by No. 10 seed Texas in the opening round to finish the season at 20–9 (13–5 SEC).

Roster

Schedule and results

|-
!colspan=9 style=| Non-conference Regular season

|-
!colspan=9 style=| SEC Regular season

|-
!colspan=9 style=| SEC Tournament

|-
!colspan=9 style=| NCAA Tournament

Rankings

Awards and honors
Alec Kessler – All-American, SEC Athlete of the Year

NBA draft

References

Georgia Bulldogs basketball seasons
Georgia
Georgia
Georgia Bulldogs
Georgia Bulldogs